James Bernard "Buzz" Knoblauch (April 22, 1912 – March 7, 1984) was an American professional basketball player. He played in the United States' National Basketball League (NBL) for the Oshkosh All-Stars in three games during the 1939–40 season. He scored two career points in the NBL.

Prior to the NBL, Knoblauch played for Carroll University and is regarded as one of the program's best ever players. He also played for the school's football team.

References

External links
Hall of Fame entry – Wisconsin Football Coaches Association

1912 births
1984 deaths
American men's basketball players
Basketball players from Wisconsin
Carroll Pioneers football players
Carroll Pioneers men's basketball players
Forwards (basketball)
High school basketball coaches in Wisconsin
High school football coaches in Wisconsin
Oshkosh All-Stars players
People from Lancaster County, Nebraska
University of Wisconsin–Superior alumni